Yeina Island is an island of volcanic origin in the Southeast Louisiade Archipelago in Milne Bay Province,  Papua New Guinea.

Geography
The island has an area of 16 km2. The island is hilly, rising to 80 m at Mt. Yeina.
The island is 10 km north of Vanatinai, and separated from it with the Yuma Channel. It is also 10 km east of Pana Tinani.
The island is circled by a coral reef. 
The interior of the island is dominated by a chain of low, grassy hill, surrounded by a coastal forest, with many mangrove areas.
Between Yeina and Vanatinai is the Marx Reef.

History
The island was discovered in the late 18th century.

Population
At the census of population in 2014, the island had 437 inhabitants, spread across 4 villages. 
The main town is Buwo, on the West coast.
Former town of Kabagi-bagi was damaged by hurricanes recently. Nearly entire island population have moved to the village of Buwo.

References

Islands of Milne Bay Province
Louisiade Archipelago